Comanche Point is the northwestern headland and prominence of the Tejon Hills, notably extending westward into the southern San Joaquin Valley, west of the Tehachapi Mountains.

Ecology
Comanche Point and the rest of the Tejon Hills are on the Tejon Ranch, in the section managed by the Tejon Ranch Conservancy.

There are natural alkali springs and marshes on Comanche Point and the alkaline uplifted marine sediment deposits that form it, which support locally and regionally endemic and rare California native plants (flora).

The major threats to the areas rare flora and fauna are overgrazing, rooting feral pigs, and invasive plant species.

See also
 — see " ~ " section for endemic flora.

References 

Landforms of Kern County, California
Headlands of California
Geography of the San Joaquin Valley
Tehachapi Mountains